The Bury Bible is a giant illustrated Bible written at Bury St Edmunds in Suffolk, England between 1121 and 1148, and illuminated by an artist known as  Master Hugo.  Since 1575 it has been in the Parker Library of Corpus Christi College, Cambridge, with the shelf-mark Cambridge CCCC M 2. 
It is an important example of Romanesque illumination from Norman England, and bears comparison with other giant bibles produced in England in the 12th century such as the Dover Bible (also in the Parker Library), Lambeth Bible, Rochester Bible, and the Winchester Bible.

Description
Only the first part of the original two-volume work has been preserved.   Twelve pictures  were  painted on parchment on separate pages and then incorporated into the work; six remain. 42 of the original 44 painted initials have been preserved.

The preserved portion of the Bible is bound in 3 volumes, with dimensions  52.2 cm high by 36 cm wide. They contain 357 folios in total.

References

External links
 Internet page about The Bury Bible of Master Hugo at 'The St Edmundsbury Chronicle' website
 link to the Bury Bible in the Parker Library on the web

Illuminated biblical manuscripts
Manuscripts of Corpus Christi College, Cambridge
12th-century biblical manuscripts